Journey Home may refer to:
 Put Domoi, a Russian street paper
 Neugier: Umi to Kaze no Koudou, an adventure game
 Journey Home (album)